Underbelly: A Tale of Two Cities, the second series of the Nine Network crime drama series Underbelly, originally aired from 9 February 2009 to 4 May 2009. It is a thirteen-part series loosely based on real events that stemmed from the marijuana trade centred on the New South Wales town of Griffith. The timeline of the series is the years between 1976 and 1987. Underbelly: A Tale of Two Cities primarily depicts the Mr. Asia drug syndicate and its influence on crime in Australia. Among the characters presented are real-life criminals Robert Trimbole, Terry Clark, George Freeman, Christopher Dale Flannery, Alphonse Gangitano and the Kane Brothers. The mini-series is a prequel to the 2008 production Underbelly, which was about the Melbourne gangland killings and forms part of the Underbelly series.

The series premiered on the Nine Network on 9 February at 8.30pm, with the double episode premiere attracting an average of 2,501,500 viewers nationally, in the mainland capitals. The show has consistently rated highly, being the most watched show on Australian television for all episodes broadcast so far. In New Zealand, the series began broadcast on 4 March where it has been advertised as Underbelly: The Mr Asia Story. This name stems from the common misidentification of protagonist Terry Clark as "Mr Asia". "Mr Asia" was in fact the name assigned to Marty Johnstone by Auckland reporter Pat Booth in his series of investigative newspaper articles into the Mr Asia drug syndicate. Johnstone was both Clark's business partner and victim.
Underbelly: A Tale of Two Cities is the second in the series of five to date. It was followed by a third series, Underbelly: The Golden Mile.

Synopsis 
The series is a broadly fictional account of the Australian criminal underworld, loosely based on events in New South Wales and Victoria between 1976 and 1987. The story revolves around the organised crime groups that stemmed from the Griffith-based marijuana trade, led by "Aussie Bob" Trimbole (Roy Billing) and "Kiwi Terry" Clark (Matthew Newton).

New Zealand drug trafficker Clark arrives in Sydney with plans to establish a heroin racket. He meets with marijuana-grower Trimbole but is at first rebuffed and bashed by crime figure George Freeman (Peter O'Brien). Soon however, he convinces Trimbole he is genuine and the two establish a partnership. The activities of local politician Donald Mackay (Andrew McFarlane) put their plans in jeopardy and when attempts to extort and blackmail him fail, Trimbole decides to have him killed without informing anyone. Trimbole and his right-hand man, Gianfranco "Frank" Tizzoni (Tony Poli), visit Melbourne to organise the hit. Detective Liz Cruickshank (Asher Keddie) is tipped off about the murder plot but her boss Joe Messina (Peter Phelps) discredits the informant, Les Kane (Martin Dingle-Wall), as unreliable. When Mackay is murdered by James Frederick Bazley (Scott Burgess), the efforts of detective Warwick Mobbs (Matt Passmore) to investigate are stymied by high-level police corruption that leads to him being posted to rural NSW.
 
Clark has soon established the Mr Asia syndicate in Sydney. Allison Dine (Anna Hutchison) arrives in Australia with her boyfriend but soon becomes Clark's lover and major accomplice as she devises a new method of passing the drugs through Customs. Meanwhile, Trimbole helps Melbourne armed robber Ray 'Chuck' Bennett (Nathan Page) organise a major heist in defiance of local stand-over men Les and Brian Kane (Tim McCunn), who demand a cut of any loot. After Bennett cuts reckless bully Chris Flannery (Dustin Clare) from his team, Flannery informs the Kanes, touching off a turf war. When two of Bennett's crew steal some of Trimbole's money from the Kanes, the violence escalates until Les Kane is machine-gunned to death in front of his family. The brutal murder ends up isolating Bennett, who is now wanted dead by a coalition including Brian Kane, Chris Flannery and Alphonse Gangitano (Elan Zavelsky). After his arrest for other crimes he decides to remain in prison, where he benefits from the protection of Mark "Chopper" Read (Renato Fabretti), to prevent his enemies outside from reaching him. He stands trial for Les' murder but is acquitted; however, while being led into court on another matter, a disguised Brian Kane shoots him dead in the middle of the court with the assistance of corrupt policemen.

Clark, his middleman in Singapore Andy Maher (Damon Gameau), and fellow Kiwi couriers Doug and Isabelle Wilson (Gareth Reeves and Simone Kessell) travel to Queensland. After throwing a wild party in a hotel room, Clark is arrested on a gun charge and extradited back to New Zealand. Doug Wilson cracks under police questioning and reveals the location where Pommy Lewis (Sam Anderson) was buried, after his murder by Terry Clark. Clark's lawyer Karen Soich (Katie Wall) becomes his new lover after he is acquitted. Clark obtains a tape of Doug's interview with Queensland Police and asks Trimbole and Tizzoni to kill them, and Tizzoni again hires Bazley for the job.

Clark goes to England to expand his business. Bazley completes the Wilson hit but the bodies are found almost immediately, finally causing the Victorian and Federal police to form a join taskforce led by David Priest (Jonny Pasvolsky), and including Mobbs, Cruickshank, Messina and a Sydney CIB detective Trevor Hakens (Dieter Brummer) with links to Dennis Kelly's (Paul Tassone) bent NSW cops. Kelly's corrupt detectives attempt to take control of the drug trade, while working to deceive the interstate police by closing down George Freeman's casinos. Allison questions her role in the syndicate after being threatened by corrupt narcotics agent Jack Smith (Samuel Johnson), who ultimately plants drugs on her in order to arrest her. Freeman begins to aggressively push into other avenues of crime, and is subsequently shot in the head by an intruder outside his home, which he survives.

Now in exile in Britain, Clark becomes paranoid upon learning of Allison's arrest, and after a meeting with Trimbole, convinces him to have Allison murdered. Reluctantly, Trimbole hires Chris Flannery, but when Smith arrests her on a trumped-up possession charge, he calls off the hit. When Clark himself also changes his mind and orders the hit called off, Trimbole helps Allison flee to America. Meanwhile, Freeman recovers from his wound while his friend, stand-over man Lenny McPherson (John McNeill), murders his would-be killer. Back in Britain, Clark and Maher meet with "Mr. Asia" aka Marty Johnstone (Merrick Watts), their supplier in Singapore. After Johnnstone offers various excuses about the poor quality of recent heroin shipments, Clark decides that he can no longer be trusted, and instructs Andy Maher to execute him.

Days later, British police find Johnstone's body and arrest Clark. Allison Dine is apprehended by the FBI and returned to Australia to turn star witness against her former lover. Trimbole learns of a massive shipment of Lebanese cannabis from his friend Dr Nick Paltos (Wadih Dona) and makes plans to import it. In the meantime, legal secretary and mob lawyer Brian Alexander (Damian de Montemas) comes under intense police scrutiny as the weakest link in the syndicate. Allison implicates the entire syndicate and provides evidence linking Trimbole to the Mr. Asia syndicate. The prime minister announces a Royal Commission and disbands the Federal Narcotics Bureau; the move ultimately results in Jack Smith and nearly 150 equally corrupt Narcotics agents being demoted to customs agent-status. But due to Trevor Haken alerting his friends in the NSW Police of the impending bust, George Freeman tips off Trimbole, who is able to flee overseas. Brian Alexander, by then having fallen into alcoholism due to stress, is fired from his position and shunned by his former allies Freeman and Trimbole. The NSW police determine that he knows too much and could spill the beans in an interrogation: Dennis Kelly and his partner Jim Egan (Daniel Roberts) lure him to a yacht where they kill him by dumping him into the sea with his feet attached to a stove. Meanwhile, Frank Tizzoni is arrested in Griffith as he was driving a van loaded with marijuana. After some time in custody he agrees to cut a deal with Messina, giving him evidence of Trimbole and Clark's involvement in the murder of the Wilsons. The taskforce furthermore begins suspecting Haken of leaking intel.

Allison testifies against Clark in England, who is convicted for murder and sentenced to twenty years. Now on the run in Ireland, Trimbole becomes an arms dealer for the IRA while also working with Paltos to fund the import of cannabis into Australia. Chris Flannery moves to Sydney and approaches Freeman for work, slaying a number of high-profile drug dealers in order to make a name for himself. But his uncontrollable temper and psychotic ego make him a target of the NSW Police and Freeman. Freeman ultimately arranges for Flannery to be executed, after manipulating Flannery into eliminating the various mobsters who have taken over the drug trade in Trimbole's absence.
 
Clark suffers a heart attack in prison and dies. With the net tightening on him, Trimbole, dying of prostate cancer, is arrested in Ireland on a trumped-up gun trafficking charge. Before the Australian police can bring evidence against him, however, he is released and flees to Spain. Meanwhile, Paltos completes the drug shipment, but Mobbs arrests him immediately; Haken is prevented from narcing on Paltos via his friends in the NSW police and is confronted. However, Haken refuses to turn against his fellow corrupt cops and, without any hard evidence, is swiftly ejected from the Joint Police Group. Paltos also refuses to co-operate, but Trimbole accidentally gives away his location to the task force in a bugged phone conversation. Priest rushes to arrest Trimbole, but arrives too late as Trimbole dies right before he enters his room

The series' epilogue states that Freeman and McPherson continue their illegal businesses for another decade or so, Laurie Prendergast (Teo Gebert) goes missing after Flannery's death (with it implied that Freeman had him murdered) and the corrupt NSW police continued their illicit operations. The final scene has Kelly and Haken, their luggage packed full of heroin and cocaine, going through customs as the corrupt Jack Smith waves his drug carrying friends through security. As the camera lingers upon Trevor's face, the narrator (Caroline Craig) talks about how the NSW police would ultimately fall due to one man (Haken), but suggests this would be "a whole other story".

Episodes

Cast 
Similar to the first season, five main cast members are billed in the opening credit sequence, Roy Billing (as Robert Trimbole), Anna Hutchison (as Allison Dine), Matthew Newton (as Terry Clark), Asher Keddie (as Detective Senior Constable Liz Cruickshank) and Peter Phelps (as Detective Inspector Joe Messina). Other major cast members are billed in the episodes in which they feature heavily. Andrew McFarlane features in the opening episodes as Liberal politician and anti-drugs campaigner Donald Mackay. Peter O'Brien portrays the late Sydney underworld figure George Freeman. Kate Ritchie appears twice as Judi Kane, wife of slain standover man Les Kane and stepmother of Trisha Kane who was married to Jason Moran. Merrick Watts appears in an episode as Marty Johnstone, Clark's main supplier. Caroline Craig is the narrator, reprising her role from the first series. Other prominent actors to appear in the series include Samuel Johnston as a corrupt Federal Narcotics Agent, John Wood as corrupt NSW chief magistrate Murray Farquhar and Diane Craig as Don Mackay's wife.

Like in the original series, the Victorian Police characters, Joe Messina and Liz Cruickshank, are fictional characters based on several unnamed Victorian police officers, due to Victorian laws that do not allow the media portrayal of officers that have not been dishonorably discharged.

Main cast 
Underbelly: A Tale of Two Cities features five regular cast members, with other actors who recur throughout the series.

 Matthew Newton as Terry Clark, the head of the Mr Asia drug ring.
 Roy Billing as "Aussie Bob" Trimbole, Clark's partner in Australia.
 Anna Hutchison as Allison Dine, Clark's lover and main drug mule.
 Asher Keddie as Senior Detective Constable Liz Cruickshank, a member of the Victorian Major Crime Squad
 Peter Phelps stars as Detective Inspector Joe Messina of the Major Crime Squad, Cruickshank's boss.

Recurring cast 
 Jonny Pasvolsky as Detective Inspector Dave Priest, head of the Federal task force investigating the syndicate
 Matt Passmore as Senior Detective Constable Warwick Mobbs, NSW detective in the Federal task force.
 Peter O'Brien as George Freeman, bookmaker and illegal casino operator
 Dustin Clare as Chris Flannery, the Melbourne hitman known as Mr Rent-a-Kill
 Damian de Montemas as Brian Alexander, the syndicate's legal advisor
 Wadih Dona as Dr. Nick Paltos, surgeon and drug trafficker
 Martin Dingle-Wall as Les Kane, Melbourne stand-over man
 Tim McCunn as Brian Kane, Melbourne stand-over man
 Nathan Page as Ray "Chuck" Bennett, Melbourne armed robber
 Samuel Johnson as Jack Smith, corrupt Federal Narcotics Agent
 Paul Tassone as Detective Sergeant Dennis Kelly, corrupt NSW police detective
 Daniel Roberts as Detective Sergeant Jim Egan, a corrupt NSW detective
 Simone Kessell as Isabelle Wilson, one of Clark's drug mules and victims
 Gareth Reeves as Douglas Wilson, one of Clark's drug mules and victims
 Damon Gameau as Andy Maher, Clark's Singapore middleman.
 Katie Wall as Karen Soich, Terry's lawyer and lover
 Caroline Craig is the series narrator, reprising her role from the first series

Guest cast 
 John McNeill as Lenny McPherson, Sydney stand-over man
 Jenna Lind as Maria Muhary, the mother of Clark's son
 Suzannah McDonald as Ann-Marie Presland, Bob's Mistress in Sydney
 Elan Zavelsky as Alphonse Gangitano, Melbourne stand-over man
 Luke McKenzie as Mick Gatto, associate of the Kane brothers
 Teo Gebert as Laurie Prendergast, one of Bennett's crew
 Wayne Bradley as Vinnie Mikkelsen, one of Bennett's crew
 Scott Burgess as James Fredrick "Fred" Bazley, Melbourne hitman
 Marcello Fabrizi as TV Reporter (1 episode)
 Ric Herbert as Al Grassby (1 episode), former government minister and associate of Trimbole
 Dieter Brummer as Detective Constable Trevor Hakens, a corrupt NSW detective
 Don Halbert as Barry Walker, a corrupt Melbourne detective
 Kate Ritchie as Judi Kane (2 episodes), wife of Les Kane
 John Wood as Murray Farquhar (2 episodes), corrupt NSW chief magistrate
 Merrick Watts as Marty Johnstone (1 episode), Clark's Singapore supplier
 Andrew McFarlane as Don Mackay, Trimbole and Clark's first victim
 Diane Craig as Mackay's wife Barbara Mackay.
 Renato Fabretti as Mark "Chopper" Read (1 episode), Melbourne stand-over man and Bennett's fellow inmate
 Tony Poli as Gianfranco "Frank" Tizzoni, Marijuana grower and a close associate of Trimbole
 Anthony Simcoe as Danny Chubb (2 episodes), Sydney drug supplier
 Brendan Donoghue as Mick Sayers (2 episodes), Sydney heroin dealer
 Paul Ireland as Tony Eustace (2 episodes), Sydney brothel owner and drug dealer
 Myles Pollard as Phil de la Salle, a Sydney homicide detective who investigates Mackay's murder
 Sam Anderson as Harry "Pommy" Lewis (3 episodes), one of Clark's drug mules and victims
 Chris Sadrinna as Greg Ollard (2 episodes), a heroin dealer and friend of Clark
 Jake Lindesay as Wayne Robb, Allison's boyfriend and drug courier
 Ian Roberts as Barry, Freeman's bodyguard
 Ria Vandervis as Kay Reynolds, one of Clark's drug mules and friend to Allison
 Peter Lamb as Johannes Muller (2 episodes), Sydney underworld figure and who organised the hit on Freeman
 Josh McConville as Michael Hurley (2 episodes), would-be drug dealer and Freeman's failed assassin
 Harold Hopkins as George Joseph (2 episodes), Melbourne gun dealer and Bazley's associate
 Aaron Hammond as Tim a Federal Narcotics Agent (2 episodes)
 Michael Sarantos as a Spanish Detective (1 episode)
 Alexander Palacio as a Spanish Nurse (2 episode)

Production 
Filming took place in both Sydney and Melbourne until March 2009. Sydney locations Richmond and Warwick Farm were used to portray Griffith in the 1970s. Along with these sites, a house in Wahroonga was used to shoot episodes seven and eight. The scenes in Freeman's casino were shot at a hotel in Sefton. Writers Peter Gawler and Greg Haddrick have admitted that there is more nudity and sex than in the original.

Reception

Critical reception 
Critics praised Kate Ritchie for her performance as Judi Kane. Ninemsn's Sam Downing said he was "pleasantly surprised" by her acting. Downing expected to be thinking of Ritchie's Home and Away character Sally the whole time, but found "she was surprisingly different and really good". TV reviewer and La Trobe University media lecturer Sue Turnbull thought Ritchie managed to cast off her soap opera persona through the role. Turnbull said that Ritchie did not overplay her scenes, and the emotion on her face indicated there was "a lot more going on".

The series received generally positive reviews, but has been criticised for embellishing and dramatising the real events on which is it based. In a column for the tabloid The Sydney Daily Telegraph on 24 February 2009, author Keith Moor is highly critical of the events depicted in the show. In the article, Moor points out among other things that Trimbole and Clark never met until after Donald Mackay was murdered, that Trimbole had no role in the Great Bookie Robbery nor did he own or live on an orange orchard and that Allison Dine didn't see Clark for three days after he killed Pommy Lewis. It is also known that Brian and Les Kane did participate in the Great Bookie Robbery and were not shut out of it as suggested by the show. Former NSW police detective Roger Rogerson was also critical of the show, particularly with regards to the characterisation of Chris Flannery and the portrayal of George Freeman as a murderer and major crime lord.

Ratings 
The series debuted with double episodes attracting an average of 2,501,500 viewers nationally, in the mainland capitals. The first episode with 2,584,000 viewers was the biggest audience for a non-sporting program premiere since the introduction of people meters in Australia in 2001. As of episode 3, the series has attracted an average of 2.489 million viewers per episode. The previous years highest rating broadcast was Seven's Packed to the Rafters with 1.938 million.

Series ratings 
The following table's ratings and rankings are subject to change as more episodes are broadcast.

*Second due to double episode premiere**5th due to other networks grand finales and premieres

Weekly ratings
The weekly Australian metropolitan ratings are below.

Sequel 
The third series, titled Underbelly: The Golden Mile, began airing in 2010. It is a sequel to the second series and a prequel to the first.

Peter Andrikidis, director of the first series, has said that writers are penning a third edition of the crime drama to link the two series. "It's being written at the moment and I think it takes it up to the first series. So it's the end of this series and up to 1995, that is the plan. I'd say it'd have something to do with the people that were set up in series one. But they're still developing that, it's just what they can get the rights on," Andrikidis said.

In a further press release on 11 June 2009, Nine Network has disclosed the plot will pick up from where A Tale of Two Cities ended in 1987: centring on the worsening systematic corruption within the NSW Police and associated illicit drug, prostitution, underground gambling, night club activities at Kings Cross in the late 1980s.  This entrenched culture of corruption and entanglement with organised crime only ended in the mid 1990s with the Wood Royal Commission which "cleaned out the Black Empire within the NSW Police".

See also
 List of Australian television series
 2009 in Australian television

References

External links
  
 

2009 Australian television series debuts
2009 Australian television series endings
2000s Australian crime television series
2000s Australian drama television series
2000s Australian television miniseries
Nine Network original programming
Television series set in the 1970s
Television series set in the 1980s
Television shows set in New South Wales

fr:Underbelly